Shirley Island is a rocky  island lying  north-west of the western end of the Bailey Peninsula, in the Windmill Islands of the Budd Coast, Wilkes Land, Antarctica. It is mostly ice-free with undulating, rocky terrain. It was first mapped from aerial photos taken by the USN's Operation Highjump in February 1947. It was named by the US-ACAN for Q. Shirley, chief photographer's mate on Operation Highjump photographic flights in coastal areas between
14° and 164° E longitude. Launch Channel is the narrow body of water between Bailey Peninsula and the island; with the relatively shallow soundings in the channel restricting its use to smaller craft and suggesting the name.

Important Bird Area
A 414 ha site comprising both Shirley Island and neighbouring Beall Island, as well as the intervening marine area, has been designated an Important Bird Area (IBA) by BirdLife International because it supports breeding colonies of about 14,000 pairs of Adélie penguins, based on 2011 satellite imagery. Other birds breeding in the IBA include snow petrels, Wilson's storm petrels and south polar skuas.

See also
 Composite Antarctic Gazetteer
 List of Antarctic and Subantarctic islands
 List of Antarctic islands south of 60° S
 Schulz Point
 SCAR
 Territorial claims in Antarctica

References

Important Bird Areas of Antarctica
Seabird colonies
Penguin colonies
Windmill Islands